The Garfagnina or Garfagnana is an indigenous breed of domestic goat from the mountainous Garfagnana area north of Lucca, in Tuscany in central Italy, from which it takes its name. It is raised in that area, in the comuni of Camporgiano, Careggine, Castelnuovo di Garfagnana, Fosciandora, Minucciano, Pieve Fosciana, Vergemoli and Villa Collemandina; in the comuni of Bagni di Lucca, Barga, Coreglia Antelminelli and Fabbriche di Vallico in the Media Valle del Serchio; and in the historic area of the Controneria, to the north-east of Bagni di Lucca. It may also be known as the Capra della Media Valle del Serchio or as the Capra della Controneria. It is probably the last remnant of the Apennine type of goat of Emilia, Liguria and Tuscany.

The Garfagnina is one of the forty-three autochthonous Italian goat breeds of limited distribution for which a herdbook is kept by the Associazione Nazionale della Pastorizia, the Italian national association of sheep- and goat-breeders. The breed was in the past much more numerous; estimated total population fell from about 5000 to 2500 between 1989 and 2006. At the end of 2013 the number registered was 354.

Use

The average milk yield of the Garfagnina is 215 litres in 195 days.  The milk averages 3.97% fat and 3.32% protein.

Kids are slaughtered at about 40 days, when they weigh about 11 kg.

References

Goat breeds
Dairy goat breeds
Goat breeds originating in Italy